Šlapanice is a municipality and village in Kladno District in the Central Bohemian Region of the Czech Republic. It has about 200 inhabitants.

Administrative part
The village of Budeničky is an administrative part of Šlapanice.

References

External links

Villages in Kladno District